Defending champion Leylah Fernandez defeated Camila Osorio in the final, 6–7(5–7), 6–4, 7–6(7–3) to win the singles tennis title at the 2022 Monterrey Open. Fernandez saved five championship points en route to the title, all in the final set.

Initially, top seed Elina Svitolina from Ukraine, refused to play in protest of the Russian invasion of Ukraine, as she was due to face Russian player Anastasia Potapova in the first round.  The match eventually went ahead after the Women's Tennis Association announced that Russian and Belarusian players would only be allowed to play under a neutral flag.

Seeds

Draw

Finals

Top half

Bottom half

Qualifying

Seeds

Qualifiers

Lucky losers

Qualifying draw

First qualifier

Second qualifier

Third qualifier

Fourth qualifier

Fifth qualifier

Sixth qualifier

References

External links
Main draw
Qualifying draw

2022 1
Monterrey Open - Singles